The First United Methodist Church, originally the Methodist Episcopal Church, South is a historic church building at 205 North Elm Street in Paris, Arkansas.  It is a two-story brick building with Late Gothic Revival styling, built between 1917 and 1928 for a congregation founded in the early 1870s.  It is the congregation's fourth sanctuary, its first three having succumbed to fire.  It has a gabled roof with corner sections and a tower topped by crenellated parapets.

The church was listed on the National Register of Historic Places in 1995.

See also
National Register of Historic Places listings in Logan County, Arkansas

References

Churches on the National Register of Historic Places in Arkansas
National Register of Historic Places in Logan County, Arkansas
Gothic Revival architecture in Arkansas
Buildings and structures completed in 1917
Buildings and structures in Paris, Arkansas